Beatrix Mine Sports Complex is a multi-use stadium in Beatrix Mine, Free State, South Africa. It is currently used mostly for football matches and is the home ground of Liverpool BTX.

Soccer venues in South Africa
Sports venues in the Free State (province)